The Devanagari numerals are the symbols used to write numbers in the Devanagari script, the predominant for northern Indian languages. They are used to write decimal numbers, instead of the Western Arabic numerals.

Table

Variants

Devanagari digits shapes may vary depending on geographical area or epoch. Some of the variants are also seen in older Sanskrit literature.

See also
Indian numbering system

References
Notes

Sources
Sanskrit Siddham (Bonji) Numbers 
Devanagari Numbers in Nepali language

Numerals